Boraston is a small village and civil parish in Shropshire, England. Nearby villages include Tenbury Wells and Burford; the nearest town is Kidderminster.

History
Boraston is an historic village; the earliest record of its existence is found in the Domesday Book, a publication that detailed geographical locations as to describe and record England's farmland and stock. It notes that in 1750 "John Smith of Boraston (in Burford) had 20,000 poles worth £20 and hops worth £30."

British travel writer John Marius Wilson described Boraston in his topographical dictionary Imperial Gazetteer of England and Wales.
'BORASTON, a township-chapelry in Burford parish, Salop; at the verge of the county, on the river Teme, the Kington canal, and the Tenbury railway, 1 mile W[est] of Tenbury. Post Town, Tenbury. Rated property, £1,141. Pop[ulation]., 235. Houses, 39. The property is divided among a few. The living is a p[erpetual]. curacy annexed to the rectory of Burford, in the diocese of Hereford. The church is tolerable.'

Boraston Church dates from the 13th century and has no recorded dedication. The nearby church at Nash, which also belongs to the Tenbury Team Ministry, is dedicated to St John the Baptist. The church has some Norman (1066–1154) features notably a blocked doorway. The building is described as having 'spiral fluting on part of the bowl; probably c.1700', it also claims that the font originates from nearby village Buildwas. Between the years 1884 and 1887 it was renovated by architect Henry Curzon; he made changes to its exterior and enlarged it.

Population and employment
According to the 2001 United Kingdom Census, Boraston had a population of 200 people, with a total of 75 households.

Between 1914 and 1918 population in the UK declined as a result of the First World War; however Boraston bucked this trend instead showing a slight increase in population. However, as more men (approximately 5 million) were called up to serve in the forces for The Second World War (1939–1945), Boraston saw an incline in numbers, a possible reason for this could be the intake of evacuees. Unlike the rest of the country Boraston also failed to see an incline in population as a result of the post-war 'baby boom', whereby nationally birth rates increased in the period from 1946 to 1974.

Unlike the 1881 Census data agricultural employment is now barely existent in the village due to the fact that food is now transported nationwide rather than just locally and the UK imports much of its produce, furthermore advancement in technology means less staff are required. Increasing service and manufacturing employment makes up 93.3% of Boraston's occupational categories. The increase in manufacturing reflects a more industrialised economy, despite the 1811 Census data being recorded in the time of Industrial Revolution; Boraston had little involvement as a small remote community with a small work force. An increase in services as an occupational category also reflects the UK's shift from primary production to having an increased tertiary sector of the economy.

The 2001 Census shows that the average distance travelled to work by a Boraston citizen is 23.65 km (14.7 miles), this suggests that most people now commute outside the village as working in Boraston is not economically viable.

Governance, transport, and amenities
Boraston is part of the Ludlow constituency for UK Parliament. Boraston's current Member of Parliament is Philip Dunne who retained his Conservative Party seat in the 2019 General Election. Prior to Brexit in 2020 it was part of the West Midlands constituency for the European Parliament.

In Boraston itself the only public transport is a bus service that starts at Worcester Bus Station and finishes at the second stop in Tenbury Wells with various villages in between, including Boraston. In terms of road access the A456 road which runs between Birmingham and Woofferton, is a mile south of Boraston.

Boraston motocross circuit is located on the outskirts of the village and is a popular track for racers and fans of the sport holding motocross championship races.

See also
Listed buildings in Boraston

References

External links

Civil parishes in Shropshire
Villages in Shropshire